Miles Millar (born 1967) is an Australian-British screenwriter, showrunner, producer, creator and director. He is known for co-creating the Netflix's Tim Burton's Addams Family spin-off television series Wednesday. Alongside his writing/producing partner Alfred Gough, he also co-created The CW’s long-running Superman prequel series Smallville, as well as the wuxia-influenced AMC series Into the Badlands and the fantasy series The Shannara Chronicles (based on the book trilogy by Terry Brooks).  He also co-wrote films such as Jackie Chan's Shanghai Noon, and Sam Raimi and Tobey Maguire's Spider-Man 2. The iconic duo worked since they met at USC School of Cinematic Arts.

Early life
Millar grew up in Sydney, Australia but emigrated to the UK when he was 9.  He was educated at Claremont Fan Court School, and is a graduate of Christ's College, Cambridge. He attended The Peter Stark Producing Program at the University of Southern California where he teamed up with his writing partner, Alfred Gough.

They sold their first script while still studying at USC. "Mango", a buddy-cop story where a cop who was allergic to animals was paired with an orangutan, sold to New Line Cinema for $400,000. The film was never made, but proved to be a professional launching pad.

Career
Miles Millar and his writing partner Alfred Gough are prolific writers/producers. Their feature credits include Sami Rami's Spider-Man 2, the action-comedy Shanghai Noon, as well as its sequel Shanghai Knights both starring Jackie Chan and Owen Wilson.  Other credits include the action-adventure The Mummy: Tomb of the Dragon Emperor, Herbie: Fully Loaded, Lethal Weapon 4, and I Am Number Four. The duo produced Hannah Montana: The Movie, based on the Disney Channel TV series starring Miley Cyrus. The feature marked the first film for the duo's The Walt Disney Company-based production company, Millar-Gough Ink. The films they have written or produced have a combined global box office in excess of one billion dollars.  

Millar and Gough created and served as executive producers of the action-adventure series Smallville, which aired from 2001 to 2011. It is the longest-running comic book-based television series of all time, and was the No. 1 show in the history of The WB. Millar and Gough left the series in 2008, after seven seasons, breaking the news of their departure with an open letter posted to a Smallville fan site. In 2010, Millar and Gough filed a multimillion-dollar lawsuit against WB Television, claiming the company had licensed Smallville to its co-owned WB and CW networks for excessively low fees, thereby cutting Millar and Gough out of tens of millions of dollars. The lawsuit was finally settled in May 2013, mere weeks before a scheduled June trial; the terms of the settlement were not made known to the public.

In 2015, they created The Shannara Chronicles, an epic fantasy television series for MTV. It is an adaptation of The Sword of Shannara trilogy of fantasy novels by Terry Brooks. It follows three heroes as they protect an ancient tree to stop the escape of banished demons. The series was filmed in the Auckland Film Studios and on location elsewhere in New Zealand. The series starred Austin Butler, Ivana Baquero and Manu Bennett. Jon Favreau was one of the executive producers along with Dan Farrah. The pilot episode was directed by Jonathan Liebesman. 

The first season of The Shannara Chronicles premiered on MTV in the United States on January 5, 2016, and consisted of 10 episodes. MTV originally greenlit a second season in April 2016; however, in May 2017, it was announced that the series would relocate to Spike (now Paramount Network). The second season premiered on October 11, 2017, and concluded November 22, 2017. On January 16, 2018, it was announced that the series had been cancelled after two seasons and that the producers were shopping the series to other networks. The series was later considered officially concluded but has since generated a cult following on Netflix.

In June 2015, Millar and Gough began production of Into the Badlands a series they created for AMC Networks. The martial arts drama was set in a gun free post apocalyptic America where warring barons had personal armies of lethally trained fighters. The series was notable as one of the only hour long dramas in American television history to feature an Asian American (Daniel Wu) as its lead. The show was a ratings hit, but received a mix response from critics. Nick Frost joined the cast in season two and proved a very popular addition to the fans of the series. The show's mythology was very loosely based on the classic Chinese text, Journey to the West. Each episode featured intricate martial arts fights that were staged and directed by legendary Hong Kong fight choreographers Huen Chiu Ku (aka Master Dee Dee Ku) and Andy Cheng. The series starred Daniel Wu, Marton Csokas, Emily Beecham, Aramis Knight and Orla Brady. The first season was filmed in New Orleans, but subsequent seasons were shot in and around Dublin, Ireland. Into The Badlands ran for 32 episodes and was cancelled due to a regime change at AMC Networks. Millar directed episodes 13 and 14 in season three of the series.  

In October 2020, Millar and Gough sold a series to Netflix based on the character of Wednesday Addams. The series was created by the duo and Tim Burton teamed with them as an executive producer and directed the first four episodes. Wednesday represents Burton's first foray into television and stars Jenna Ortega in the title role. The series also stars Catherine Zeta-Jones as Morticia Addams, Luis Guzman as Gomez Addams as well as Gwendoline Christie as Larissa Weems.  

Millar and Gough created the 1999-2000 American television series The Strip starring Sean Patrick Flannery and the 2011 Charlie's Angels revival. Both ran 8 episodes. They also created the 2006 television pilot of Aquaman, based on the DC Comics character of the same name, which ran as a standalone episode.

Filmography

Films

Television

References

External links
 

Alumni of Christ's College, Cambridge
British male screenwriters
Living people
USC School of Cinematic Arts alumni
Place of birth missing (living people)
People educated at Claremont Fan Court School
1967 births
Showrunners
British television writers
British television producers
British film producers
British male television writers